Kshetra Singh (died 1382), was Maharana (r. 1364–1382) of Mewar Kingdom. He was the son of Maharana Hammir Singh.
In his reign, he conquered Ajmer and Mandalgarh.

Rule

Kshetra, who ruled Mewar from A.D. 1364 to A.D. 1382, was the son and successor of the celebrated Rana Hammir. He greatly enlarged the kingdom. He captured Ajmer and Jahazpur, re-annexed Mandalgarh, Mandsaur and the whole of Chappan to Mewar. He obtained a victory over the Sultan of Delhi, who was utterly defeated at Bakrole. Kshetra Singh also took the Sultan of Gujarat prisoner in a battle. The Kumbalgarh inscription says that he captured Zafar Khan, Sultan of Patan (who later became the first independent Sultan of Gujarat).

Kshetra Singh further increased his fame by defeating the Sultan of Malwa and killing his general Amir Shah identified as Dilawar Khan.

Kshetra Singh died in 1382 AD during a campaign against the Hada of Bundi.

After his death, he was succeeded by Rana Lakha Singh (1382-1421).

References 

Mewar dynasty
1382 deaths
Rajput rulers
Hindu monarchs
Year of birth unknown